Jan Kanty Fontana (1731 - 1800) was an architect, surveyor and burgrave of the Royal Castle, Warsaw. He was the son of Józef Fontana and the younger brother of Jakub Fontana. He was ennobled by King Stanisław August Poniatowski on 9 September 1769 and received his own coat of arms, Fontana.

References

Architects from Warsaw
1731 births
1800 deaths